The Trempealeauan is the upper or latest stage of the Upper or Late Cambrian in North America, spanning about 4 million years from about 492.5 to 488.3 m.y.a., equivalent to the Fengshanian of China. The name comes from the Trempealeau Formation, named for the town of Trempealeau in western Wisconsin, located on the Mississippi River.

The Trempealeauan follows, or overlies, the Franconian, which is the middle stage of the Upper Cambrian in North America and is followed by the Gasconadian in the Lower Ordovician. Together with the Dresbachian at the bottom, the Trempealeauan and Franconian make up the Croixan Series.

References
 Chen Jun-yuan & Teichert C, 1983; Cambrian Cephalopods, Geology Vol 11, pp647–650, Nov 1983
 Flower R.H.1964,  The Nautiloid Order Ellesmerocerida (Cephalopoda) Menoir 12, New Mexico Bureau of Mines and Mineral Resources, Socorro, NM
Harland,W. B. et al1 990. A Geologic Time Scale 1989. Cambridge University Press, Cambridge . Ref in Paleobiology Database on line.
 Moore, Lalicker, and Fischer 1952; Invertebrate Fossils; McGraw-Hill; fig 1-17.
 Geowhen database. 

Cambrian geochronology
Cambrian geology of Wisconsin
Jiangshanian